LEARN may refer to:

 Law Enforcement Agency Resource Network, a website run by the Anti-Defamation League
 Lanka Education and Research Network

See also
 Learn (disambiguation)